Merven Clair (born 2 July 1993) is a Mauritian boxer. He competed at the 2016 Summer Olympics in the men's middleweight event, in which he was eliminated in the first round by Hosam Bakr Abdin. He also competed at the 2014 Commonwealth Games in the welterweight class where he was also eliminated in the first round, that time by Kenya's Rayton Okwiri. At the 68th edition of the Strandja Memorial in February 2017, he placed third after a defeat in the semifinals to eventual tournament winner Pat McCormack. At the 2017 African Boxing Championships in Brazzaville, Clair secured a silver medal in the 69 kg weight class, suffering his only defeat of the tournament in the final against Muzamiru Kakande from Uganda. He won the gold medal at the 2019 African Games in Rabat, Morocco in the welterweight class by defeating the Nigerian boxer Abdulafeez Osoba in the final. At the 2020 African Boxing Olympic Qualification Tournament, he was defeated in the quarterfinals by Stephen Zimba by referee stoppage in the second round.

He qualified to represent Mauritius at the 2020 Summer Olympics and competed in the men's welterweight event.

Honours
Mauritius Sportsman of the Year 2019

References

External links
 

1993 births
Living people
Mauritian male boxers
Olympic boxers of Mauritius
Boxers at the 2016 Summer Olympics
Commonwealth Games competitors for Mauritius
Boxers at the 2014 Commonwealth Games
Boxers at the 2018 Commonwealth Games
Competitors at the 2019 African Games
African Games medalists in boxing
African Games gold medalists for Mauritius
Middleweight boxers
Boxers at the 2020 Summer Olympics